Michal Šíma (born 28 April 1992) is a Slovak biathlete. He competed in the 2018 Winter Olympics.

Biathlon results
All results are sourced from the International Biathlon Union.

World Championships
0 medals

*During Olympic seasons competitions are only held for those events not included in the Olympic program.
**The single mixed relay was added as an event in 2019.

References

1992 births
Living people
Biathletes at the 2018 Winter Olympics
Biathletes at the 2022 Winter Olympics
Slovak male biathletes
Olympic biathletes of Slovakia
Sportspeople from Brezno
Competitors at the 2015 Winter Universiade